Humaitá is a town and distrito on the Paraguay River in southern Paraguay. During the Paraguayan War, it served as the main Paraguayan stronghold from 1866 until its fall in August 1868. Up to 24,000 troops were housed there at one point. It served as the de facto residence of the Paraguayan government until March 1868.

Being at 275 km south of Asunción, this is a Paraguayan city that has a great historical and cultural heritage with portions of the old fortifications, including some large earthworks, still visible.  It also possesses the remains of a Jesuit church dating from the 18th century.

Toponymy 

Humaitá comes from the Guaraní words “yma” (meaning ancient) and “itá” (meaning stone).

Geography 
The predominant geography in the zone is of a sheet of low areas, of whitish land, without prominent waviness. Due to the proximity of the Paraguay River, the increase of the waves overwhelms the whole bordering zone, therefore the geopolitical importance that the city had in the past.

Climate 
The climate is subtropical, with temperatures reaching -2 °C in winter and 40 °C in the summer.

History 

The remains of the old fortress of Humaitá are located on the left side of the Paraguay River, approximately 430 km to the south of Asunción.
During the Paraguayan War (1864–1870) this fortress was important because it controlled river access to the capital, Asunción.

The defenses of Humaitá were begun by Carlos Antonio López (1790–1862).  Built both on water and on land, they dominate a bend in the river.  They include two walls with heavily armed bunkers,  barracks for troops and officials, ammunition stores, offices, a church, and cemeteries, protected by kilometers of trenches.  Mines and chains were used to restrict navigation of the river.

Economy 

The inhabitants fish, raise cattle, and practice small-scale agriculture.

Local crafts include vases, gauntlets, pictures in burlap, and articles made from vegetable sponge. Carpets, tapestries, tablecloths, and crocheted apparel are also produced.

Transportation 
Humaitá may be reached via Route 1 from Asunción, after reaching San Ignacio, take the detour to Pilar. Humaitá also may be reached through the new Villeta–Alberdi–Pilar Route 

One may also take the bus from Asunción to Pilar and transfer to an interurban bus that serves Humaitá.

Patrimony 

The city has a rich historical patrimony. Humaitá was more involved than any other city in the Paraguayan War. The Paraguayan army used this city to contain the invasion by the Alliance. By the end of the war the city had been totally wrecked by the invading troops.

The Cuartel de López, a museum in Francisco Solano López's former barracks, has three rooms where bullets, cannon, stirrups, spurs, swords, and other battlefield relics are displayed.

Tourism 

Many tourists visit Humaitá. Students from all over Paraguay come to view the vestiges of the Paraguayan War, as do Uruguayan, Brazilian, Paraguayan and Argentine military men and civilians from throughout America and Europe.

 Ruins of Humaitá.  Only a few vestiges survived bombardment by enemy cannons during the war. One of these was San Carlos Borromeo's church. Carlos Antonio López ordered its construction.  It was inaugurated on January 1, 1861. At the time, it was considered one of the most beautiful in the  Americas.
 Itapunta
 Curupayty
 Estero Bellaco

Hotels in the city include the Municipal Hotel, with Italianate architecture, constructed at the end of the 19th century.  Many historians believe that Stroessner stayed there during the 1947 revolution.

Restaurants 

A restaurant called The Terrace is located in the middle of the town square.

Fishing 

Due to its location on the Paraguay River, Humaitá is also a popular place to fish. Fish such as Mandi'i, catfish, piranha, armado, duck, dorado, surubí, and pacú provide the main income of fishermen. Milanese surubí is a popular dish in local restaurants.

Gallery

Twin towns
Humaitá is twinned with:
 Malbrán, Argentina

References

Sources 

													
World Gazeteer: Paraguay – World-Gazetteer.com													* Revista Zeta

Populated places in the Ñeembucú Department
Populated places established in 1778

pt:Fortaleza de Humaitá